Portland Cement Association is a non-profit organization that promotes the use of cement and concrete. The organization conducts and sponsors research, participates in setting cement manufacturing standards, and disseminates free designs of concrete-based architectural structures, among other functions.

History 

PCA's origin dates back to 1902, following a meeting of cement manufacturers in the eastern U.S. who assembled to discuss problems with cement packaging. At the time, cement was packaged in reusable cloth sacks that were returned to the manufacturer, but that created problems for consumers. On October 1, 1902, this issue prompted the formation of a temporary organization that would represent all the manufacturers involved. The organization was unofficially called "the Eastern Portland Cement Manufacturers." The organization was formally established and its constitution and by-laws adopted by the representatives of 20 cement companies in New York on October 23, 1902, and renamed the Association of Portland Cement Manufacturers.

In 1916, as the Association entered into a contract with the Lewis Institute to conduct joint research in concrete, it was renamed again to the Portland Cement Association, and its headquarters moved from Philadelphia to Chicago.

See also 
 American Concrete Institute

References

Literature cited

External links 
 

American engineering organizations
Trade associations based in the United States
Organizations based in Illinois
Organizations established in 1902
Cement industry